The Greek Volley League MVP is the yearly MVP award for the best player of Greek Volleyleague, the Greek first tier professional championship. It begin with 1998–99 season and first winner was Marios Giourdas. The recordman of this award is Ernardo Gómez who has won the MVP award three times. Marios Giourdas and Andrej Kravárik has won two times.

Winners

References

External links
Greek Volleyleague

Volleyball in Greece
Volleyball awards